Aegyptocetus is an extinct genus of protocetid archaeocete whale known from Egypt.

Taxonomy

Aegyptocetus is known from the articulated holotype MSNTUP I-15459, an almost complete cranium, lower jaws (with teeth) and a partial postcranial skeleton (cervical and thoracic vertebrae and ribs). The specimen was recovered when marbleized limestone was imported commercially to Italy. Its cause of death may have been an attack by a large shark as pattern of shark tooth marks preserved on the ribs.

Aegyptocetus was first named by Giovanni Bianucci and Philip D. Gingerich in 2011 and the type species is Aegyptocetus tarfa. The generic name is derived from Aegyptus, Latin for Egypt, and cetus, Latin for whale. The specific name refers to Wadi Tarfa, the desert valley where the holotype was found.

Description
 
Aegyptocetus had features in its cranium and dentaries adapted for hearing in water.  Its thoracic vertebrae (T1–T8), however, had long neural spines which is a characteristic of the weight-bearing system of land-living mammals retained in protocetids, such as Rodhocetus and Qaisracetus, but absent in the more derived basilosaurids, such as Dorudon.  This suggests that Aegyptocetus, like other protocetids, was able to support its body on land and probably was semi-aquatic.

References

Notes

Sources

 

Protocetidae
Eocene mammals of Africa
Fossil taxa described in 2011
Prehistoric cetacean genera